Scarsdale Woman's Club is a historic women's club located at Scarsdale, Westchester County, New York. It was built in 1858 and expanded and remodeled in 1872 in the Second Empire style.  It was again expanded and remodeled in 1941 by Hobart Upjohn. The former residence is a -story wood-frame building, clad in stucco, with a prominent mansard roof covered in red and blue hexagonal slate tiles. It features a five-bay open front porch supported by square and Doric order columns.  It was acquired by the Scarsdale Women's' Club in 1928 for use as a clubhouse.

It was added to the National Register of Historic Places in 2008.

See also
Website
National Register of Historic Places listings in southern Westchester County, New York

References

Clubhouses on the National Register of Historic Places in New York (state)
Second Empire architecture in New York (state)
Cultural infrastructure completed in 1858
Buildings and structures in Westchester County, New York
History of women in New York (state)
Women's club buildings in New York (state)
National Register of Historic Places in Westchester County, New York
Scarsdale, New York